DPE is an abbreviation for:

Organizations
 Department for Professional Employees, AFL-CIO
 Department of Public Enterprises, South African government ministry
 Dis Politika Enstitüsü, Turkish think tank

Science
 Downstream promoter element in genetics

Other
 Decriminalised Parking Enforcement, UK civil enforcement
 Demilitarization Protective Ensemble, a one-piece disposable suit used in chemical weapons disposal
 Designated Pilot Examiner — a person certified by FAA to conduct pilot rating
 Dynamic Provisioning Environment - an automated server computing environment
 Development - Printing - Enlargement - Japanese abbreviation for film processing.